Polyura jupiter is a butterfly of the family Nymphalidae. It is found in Indonesia and surrounding islands.

The larvae feed on Albizia stipulata.

Subspecies
Polyura jupiter jupiter (western Papua)
Polyura jupiter kronos (Honrath, 1888)  (Bismarck Archipelago)
Polyura jupiter admiralitatis (Rothschild, 1915) (Admiralty Islands)
Polyura jupiter attila (Grose-Smith, 1889) (Guadalcanal)
Polyura jupiter keianus (Rothschild & Jordan, 1897) (Key)
Polyura jupiter seitzi (Rothschild, 1897) (Tanimbar)
Polyura jupiter watubela (Rothschild, 1903) (Watubela)

References

Polyura
Butterflies described in 1869
Butterflies of Indonesia
Taxa named by Arthur Gardiner Butler